Omoba  Segun Adewale (born 1949) is a Nigerian musician. He is considered the pioneer of Yo-pop, a mix of funk, jazz, juju, reggae, and Afro-beat.

Biography
Omoba Segun Adewale was born into a royal family in Osogbo Nigeria. Because his father objected to his career in music Adewale left home and moved to Lagos, Nigeria, where he met Juju musicians S. L. Atolagbe and I. K. Dairo. In the 1970s, Adewale and Shina Peters both played with Prince Adekunle, a pioneer of Afrobeat Jùjú music.

Musical career
In 1977 Adewale, along with Shina Peters, formed a new group called Shina Adewale and the Superstars International. They released nine recordings but split in 1980 to form their own separate groups.

By 1984 the music of Adewale had evolved into what is now described as Yo-Pop.

References

Nigerian male musicians
1955 births
Living people
Yoruba musicians
Musicians from Osogbo
Yoruba royalty
20th-century Nigerian musicians
20th-century male musicians